Jonathan Earl Bostic Sr. (born October 6, 1962) is a former American football defensive back who played for the Detroit Lions of the National Football League from 1985 to 1987. He was drafted by the Kansas City Chiefs in the sixth round of the 1985 NFL Draft. He played college football at Bethune-Cookman.

Bostic's son, Jon Bostic, plays for the Washington Commanders.

References

1962 births
Living people
People from Titusville, Florida
Players of American football from Florida
American football cornerbacks
Bethune–Cookman Wildcats football players
Detroit Lions players
National Football League replacement players